Lee Marshall (born 21 January 1979) is an English retired professional footballer who played as a midfielder or right-back. He earned one cap with the England U21 national team.

Club career 
Marshall began his career in non-league football with Enfield, before signing for Norwich City. He then made a £600,000 switch to Leicester City in March 2001.

Marshall moved on to West Bromwich Albion for £700,000 in August 2002. However, he found his first team chances limited, making ten appearances, although he did have the distinction of scoring the club's first goal in the Premier League, a late consolation in a 3–1 home defeat to Leeds United.

During a spell on loan at Hull City, Marshall suffered a broken leg and was forced to retire from playing in 2005.

International career
Marshall was capped by England at under-21 level in a friendly match against France.

Career statistics

References

External links

Career Information

Living people
1979 births
Footballers from Islington (district)
English footballers
England under-21 international footballers
Norwich City F.C. players
Leicester City F.C. players
West Bromwich Albion F.C. players
Hull City A.F.C. players
Enfield F.C. players
Premier League players
Association football midfielders